List of football clubs in Bermuda playing association football.

Teams in USL
Bermuda Hogges are a 2007 expansion team, playing in the US league USL Second Division. They dissolved in 2013.

Premier Division
St. David's Warriors
St. George's Colts
Boulevard Community Club Blazers
Dandy Town Hornets
Devonshire Cougars
North Village Community Club
PHC Zebras
Devonshire Colts
Somerset Eagles
Southampton Rangers

First Division
X-Roads Warriors F.C.
Hamilton Parish FC
Paget Lions
Prospect Prospects
Social Club Blue Birds
Somerset Trojans
Robin Hood FC
B.A.A.
Wolves
MR Onions
Ireland Rangers

Commercial

"A"
B.A.A.
DRC Lions
Key West Rangers
Lobster Pot
MR Onions
NVCC Rams
PHC Commercial
Robin Hood FC
SBRC Peskies
Tuff Dogs
Valley

"B"
Dandy Town Roots
Devonshire Colts All Stars
DockYard Falcons
Hamilton Parish Commercial
Pest Control
Prison Officers RC
SCC Extros
St. George's All Stars
Vasco Mariners
Boulevard Commercial
Prospect/Fire
Wolves Commercial

Ladies
BISYS Royals
Boulevard Ladies
Dandy Stars
Lady Cougars
PHC Ladies
SCC Hurricanes

Bermuda
 
Football clubs